The 1476 Altarpiece or San Domenico Altarpiece is a 1476 tempera and gold on panel altarpiece by Carlo Crivelli. Its central panel of the Pietà is now in the Metropolitan Museum of Art in New York, whilst the other nine are now in the National Gallery, London.

History
The altarpiece was likely originally constructed for the Dominican church of Ascoli Piceno, given the inclusion of Dominican saints on the lower levels of the altarpiece. The church held another 1476 Crivelli work, the Saint Peter Martyr Altarpiece. Both works were dismantled from their altars  due to renovations in the church. They were then sold to an antiquarian, Grossi, who further separated the panels and regrouped them. (The predellas that went with the altarpieces are lost.)

The 1476 Altarpiece arrived at London's National Gallery in 1868, having come from the Demidov collection. 

Art historians Federico Zeri and  reintegrated the formerly separated altarpieces, referring first to the Pietà in the Metropolitan Museum and second to the Madonna in the Museum of Fine Arts of Budapest. In 1961, the National Gallery again disjoined its panels and reconstructed them into two separate polyptychs.

Description and style

The altarpiece has a traditional setting, with a Madonna Enthroned with Child at the center, the saints depicted to the sides, and on the upper level a Pietà and half-figure saints.

The structure of the altarpiece perplexed critics for a long time. Art historians eventually adopted the theory that the altarpiece was actually an assemblage of panels from different sources.

Panels
Lower register:
 Madonna and Child, 148x63 cm, signed OPVS KAROLI CRIVELLI VENETI 1476
 Saint John the Baptist, 138x40 cm
 Saint Peter, 138x40 cm
 Saint Catherine of Alexandria, 138x40 cm
 Saint Dominic, 138x40 cm

Upper register:
 Saint Francis, 61x40 cm
 Saint Andrew, 61x40 cm
 Pietà, 69x63,5 cm
 Saint Stephen, 61x40 cm
 Saint Thomas, 61x40 cm

Possible reconstruction

Bibliography

External links
 National Gallery
 Met Collections

Collections of the National Gallery, London
1476 paintings
Paintings in the collection of the Metropolitan Museum of Art
Paintings by Carlo Crivelli
Altarpieces
Cultural depictions of John the Baptist
Paintings of Saint Stephen
Paintings of Francis of Assisi
Paintings depicting Andrew the Apostle
Paintings depicting Saint Peter
Paintings depicting Thomas the Apostle
Paintings of Thomas Aquinas
Paintings of Saint Dominic
Paintings of Catherine of Alexandria